Stenanthemum limitatum is a species of flowering plant in the family Rhamnaceae and is endemic to the southwest of Western Australia. It is an erect or straggling shrub with sparsely hairy young stems, egg-shaped to fan-shaped leaves and greyish, softly-hairy heads of white or cream-coloured flowers.

Description
The end of the leaf is notched, the upper surface scaly or bristly-hairy and the lower surface glabrous or softly hairy.

Taxonomy and naming
Stenanthemum limitatum was first formally described in 1995 by Barbara Lynette Rye in the journal Nuytsia from specimens collected by Charles Gardner on Mount Lesueur in 1946. The specific epithet (limitatum) means "enclosed within limits", referring to the restricted range of this species.

Distribution and habitat
This species grows in heath and shrubland on laterite near Mount Lesueur in the Geraldton Sandplains bioregion of south-western Western Australia.

Conservation status
Stenanthemum limitatum is listed as "Priority Two" by the Western Australian Government Department of Biodiversity, Conservation and Attractions, meaning that it is poorly known and from only one or a few locations.

References

limitatum
Rosales of Australia
Flora of Western Australia
Plants described in 1995
Taxa named by Barbara Lynette Rye